Simão Verza Bertelli (born 2 July 1993) is a Brazilian professional footballer who plays as a goalkeeper for ABC.

Professional career
Bertelli made his professional debut with Glória in a 2-1 Campeonato Gaúcho loss to São Paulo RS on 3 February 2016. After helping Operário with a couple promotions in the Brazilian league to the Campeonato Brasileiro Série B, Bertelli joined Paços de Ferreira on loan in Portugal on 26 July 2019.

References

External links
 
 Profile

1993 births
Living people
Sportspeople from Rio Grande do Sul
Brazilian footballers
F.C. Paços de Ferreira players
Operário Ferroviário Esporte Clube players
Esporte Clube Novo Hamburgo players
Primeira Liga players
Campeonato Brasileiro Série B players
Campeonato Brasileiro Série C players
Campeonato Brasileiro Série D players
Association football goalkeepers
Brazilian expatriate footballers
Expatriate footballers in Portugal